Robert Angus Whitlock (born July 16, 1949) is a Canadian former professional ice hockey player who played 244 games in the World Hockey Association and one game in the National Hockey League. He played for the  Chicago Cougars, Los Angeles Sharks, Indianapolis Racers, and Minnesota North Stars. His lone NHL game came with the North Stars on November 22, 1969 against the Los Angeles Kings.

Career statistics

Regular season and playoffs

See also
List of players who played only one game in the NHL

External links
 

1949 births
Living people
Canadian expatriate ice hockey players in the United States
Canadian ice hockey left wingers
Chicago Cougars players
Edmonton Oil Kings (WCHL) players
Erie Blades players
Ice hockey people from Prince Edward Island
Indianapolis Racers players
Iowa Stars (CHL) players
Johnstown Jets (NAHL) players
Los Angeles Sharks players
Minnesota North Stars players
Mohawk Valley Comets (NAHL) players
Sportspeople from Charlottetown
Undrafted National Hockey League players
Western International Hockey League players